Dejan Mihajlov (born 26 February 1972) is a Serbian lawyer and politician. He served as the Secretary-General of the Government of Serbia from 2004 to 2008.

Education and career
He was born in 1972 in Pančevo. He graduated from the University of Belgrade Faculty of Law. Between 2000 and 2004, Mihajlov was a president of the Democratic Party of Serbia's caucus in the Serbian parliament.

He served as the Secretary-General of the Government of Serbia from 2004 to 2008.

On 9 November 2006, Serbian police issued an arrest warrant for Mihajlov for failing to appear before the Court in a case presented against him after the court had sent twenty-six notices requesting his presence.

References

1972 births
Living people
Politicians from Pančevo
Democratic Party of Serbia politicians
Politicians of Vojvodina